Tange International Co. is a major Japanese manufacturer of high-quality steel tubing for bicycle frames, established before 1920.

They are a rival to the British-based tubing manufacturer Reynolds. Where the de facto standard of bicycle tubing from European bike boom bikes is Reynolds steel, the Japanese de facto standard is Tange. They were also found throughout the 1980s on many higher-quality far eastern-produced bikes because of the higher cost of Reynolds steel.

They still produce high-quality frame tubing to compete with companies like Reynolds and Columbus; however, they only produce chromoly steel nowadays instead of mangaloy steel.  Their current tubing range consists of four tiers: Tange Chromo, Infinity, Prestige and Ultimate.

Soma have been using Tange Prestige tubes since 2007, and the first non-Italian tube to be used by Pinarello was Tange Prestige. The British bicycle manufacturer Charge also uses a variety of Tange tubing for their steel frames.

References

External links 
 Official website

Cycle parts manufacturers
Cycle manufacturers of Japan
1920 establishments in Japan
Companies based in Osaka Prefecture